Robert Henry  "Farmer" Ray (September 17, 1886 – March 11, 1963) was a  Major League Baseball pitcher. Ray played for the St. Louis Browns in the 1910 season. In 21 career games, he had a 4–10 record, with a 3.58 ERA. He batted left and threw right-handed.

Ray was born in Fort Lyon, Colorado, and died in Electra, Texas.

External links
Baseball Reference.com page

1886 births
1963 deaths
St. Louis Browns players
People from Bent County, Colorado
Shreveport Pirates (baseball) players
Fort Worth Panthers players
Hartford Senators players
Houston Buffaloes players
Sherman Lions players
Sherman Hitters players
Denison Railroaders players
Baseball players from Colorado